The 2022 season is the 115th season in which the Richmond Football Club has participated in the VFL/AFL and the third season in which it participated in the AFL Women's competition.

AFL

2022 season
The AFL season will run from March 2022 to August 2022.

2021 off-season list changes

Retirements and delistings

Free agency

Trades

National draft

Rookie draft

Mid-season draft

2022 squad

2022 season

Pre-season community series

Home and away season

Finals

Awards

League awards

All-Australian team

Rising Star
Nominations:

22 Under 22 team

Club awards

Jack Dyer Medal

Michael Roach Medal

AFL Women's

2022 season (summer/season six)

2021 off-season list changes

Special assistance
After poor on-field performances in 2020 and 2021, the AFL decided to award special assistance to Richmond in the form of a mid-second round draft selection (originally number 26 overall).

Retirements and delistings

Trades

National draft

2022 squad (season six)

2022 season (season six)

Home and away season

Awards

League awards

All-Australian team

22 Under 22 team

Club awards

Best and Fairest award

Leading goalkicker award

2022 season (spring/season seven)
In May 2022, the AFL announced it would shift the timing of the AFL Women's competition, beginning the season in the last weekend of August for the first time. As a result, the first season under this arrangement was the second season played in the 2022 calendar year.

2022 (season six) off-season list changes

Retirements and delistings

Expansion club losses

Trades

National draft

Signings

2022 squad (season seven)

2022 season (season seven)

Home and away season

References

External links 
 Richmond Tigers Official AFL Site
 Official Site of the Australian Football League

Richmond Football Club seasons
Richmond